Flying Fifty-Five is a 1939 British sports-drama film directed by Reginald Denham and starring  Derrick De Marney, Nancy Burne, Marius Goring, John Warwick and Peter Gawthorne. It was made by Admiral Films at Welwyn Studios. The film is based on a 1922 novel of the same name by Edgar Wallace which had previously been made into a 1924 silent film The Flying Fifty-Five.

Plot
After being disinherited by his wealthy father, an amateur jockey, Bill Urquhart goes to work under an assumed name (Bill Hart) at a rural racing stables owned and run by Stella Barrington and her drunken brother, Charles, who is an old friend of Bill's. Confusion arises when Bill is mistakenly reported to have been murdered.

Partial cast
 Derrick De Marney as Bill Urquhart
 Nancy Burne as Stella Barrington
 Marius Goring as Charles Barrington
 John Warwick as Jebson
 Peter Gawthorne as Jonas Urquhart
 D. A. Clarke-Smith as Jacques Gregory
 Amy Veness as Aunt Eliza
 Ronald Shiner as Scrubby Oaks
 Billy Bray as Cheerful
 Francesca Bahrle as Clare
 Terry-Thomas as Young man
 Norman Pierce as Creditor
 Basil McGrail as Jockey

See also
 The Flying Fifty-Five (1924)

References

Bibliography
 Wood, Linda. British Films 1927-1939. British Film Institute, 1986.

External links
 
 
 

1939 films
1930s sports drama films
British black-and-white films
Films directed by Reginald Denham
Films based on British novels
Films based on works by Edgar Wallace
British sports drama films
British horse racing films
Films shot at Welwyn Studios
Films set in England
Remakes of British films
Sound film remakes of silent films
1939 drama films
1930s English-language films
1930s British films